Dzhabrail Aslanbekovich Kadiyev (born 21 January 1994) is a Russian football player.

Club career
On 30 January 2013 he was transferred to the Israeli club Beitar Jerusalem along with Zaur Sadayev.

References

External links

1994 births
Sportspeople from Grozny
Living people
Russian footballers
Russia youth international footballers
Russian expatriate footballers
Expatriate footballers in Israel
Expatriate footballers in Belarus
Russian expatriate sportspeople in Israel
Israeli Premier League players
FC Akhmat Grozny players
Beitar Jerusalem F.C. players
FC Belshina Bobruisk players
Association football defenders
Association football forwards
Belarusian Premier League players